Peter118 is a British Christian punk band, primarily playing pop punk. They are from Stoke-on-Trent, United Kingdom. The band started making music in 2012, and consists of vocalist and guitarist Peter Field, bassist Janine Read, and drummer Sam Critchley. Their first release, Make It or Break It, an extended play, was released in 2015, with Thumper Punk Records and InPresence Records.

Background
Peter118 is a Christian punk band from Stoke-on-Trent, United Kingdom. The band gained attention with audiences in the UK pop punk scene through memes and jokes in regards to the band's lyrical content and bizarre marketing approach which primarily consisted of spam messaging on social media.

Peter118 gained airplay on Kerrang radio , Total Rock, KROQ, Sirius XM and appeared on Christian Tv in America- JUce Tv, Grock TV.

Peter118 have played Slam Dunk Festival in 2018 , Creation festival 2017 to 2019, King Stock Festival 2017 to 2019,  Rock Alive in Holland in 2018, Rainbow Rock in Sweden in 2017 and 2018 and played the Extreme Tour leg of europe 2016 to 2022. 

Peter118 gained PGMA award in 2015 for Christian Rock for contributions towards the gospel music industry.  In 2020 gained  Christian music awards for Rock and Revival Radio - best punk rock music.

Music history
The band began as a musical entity in 2012, with their first extended play, Make It or Break It, released on 16 March 2015 on Thumper Punk Records and InPresence Records.

In 2017 Peter118 released 'Merry Christmas' which was released by  the legendary DJ Rodney Bingenheimer on his Christmas album Santa's got a GTO volume 2 on Gearhead records.

In 2018 Peter118 released music on Raven Faith Records and in 2021 released an album on 8up Records.

Members

Past members
Members

 Janine Read - bass (2014- 2019)
 Sam Critchley - drums (2014-2019)
 Alisha Palmer backing vocals ( 2018-2019)
Current line up 

Lee- guitars (2020- to current) 

Peter - bass, vocals ( 2014 to current) 

Alastair- drums (2019 to current)

Discography
EPs
 Make It or Break It (March 2015, Thumper Punk & InPresence)
 Need You More (2016, Thumper Punk & InPresence)
 In Stereo Split EP with No Lost Cause (Aug 2017, Thumper Punk & InPresence)

References

2012 establishments in the United Kingdom
Musical groups established in 2012